Route 96 is a  numbered state highway in the U.S. states of Rhode Island and Massachusetts.

Route description
Route 96 starts in the village of Harrisville with its southern terminus with Route 98. Route 96 starts as Callahan School Street heading due west until it reaches Hill Road and branches off north as Round Top Road. From then it heads northwesterly towards the Massachusetts border and the town of Douglas. Once Route 96 reaches Massachusetts, it is turned into MA Route 96 as South Street. After Route 96 branches off north, the only roads it intersects with are Smith Road, West Road, and Brook Road; all within the town limits of Burrillville. After the state line, it runs  to the northwest, and ends at an intersection with Route 16.

Major intersections

References

External links

2019 Highway Map, Rhode Island

Burrillville, Rhode Island
096
096
Transportation in Providence County, Rhode Island
Transportation in Worcester County, Massachusetts